This article contains information about the literary events and publications of 1531.

Events
unknown dates
The first emblem book appears, the Emblemata, an unauthorized issue by the printer Heinrich Steyner in Augsburg, Bavaria, of Italian jurist Andrea Alciato's privately circulated Latin verses, accompanied by woodcuts. 
Petrarch's poetry Trionfi (Triumphs) is first translated into French as Les Triomphes.

New books

Prose
Henry Cornelius Agrippa – De occulta philosophia libri tres, Book One
Andrea Alciato – Emblemata
Sir Thomas Elyot – The Boke Named the Governour (the first English work of moral philosophy)
Niccolò Machiavelli (posthumous) – Discourses on Livy
Paracelsus – Opus Paramirum (written in St. Gallen)
Michael Servetus –  (On the Errors of the Trinity)
William Turner –  (completed in 1568)

Drama
Accademia degli Intronati – Gl' Ingannati

Poetry

Marguerite de Navarre – 
Approximate date – John Skelton – Colin Clout

Births
June 1 – János Zsámboky, Hungarian humanist scholar (died 1584)
October 7 – Scipione Ammirato, Italian historian (died 1601)
November 29 – Johannes Letzner, German historian (died 1613)
Unknown date – Ercole Bottrigari, Italian poet, music theorist and publisher (died 1612)

Deaths
October 11 – Huldrych Zwingli, Swiss theologian (born 1484; killed in Second War of Kappel)
probable – Fernan Perez de Oliva, Spanish linguist (born c. 1492)

References

1531

1531 books
Renaissance literature
Early Modern literature
Years of the 16th century in literature